The maxillary artery supplies deep structures of the face. It branches from the external carotid artery just deep to the neck of the mandible.

Structure
The maxillary artery, the larger of the two terminal branches of the external carotid artery, arises behind the neck of the mandible, and is at first imbedded in the substance of the parotid gland; it passes forward between the ramus of the mandible and the sphenomandibular ligament, and then runs, either superficial or deep to the lateral pterygoid muscle, to the pterygopalatine fossa.

It supplies the deep structures of the face, and may be divided into mandibular, pterygoid, and pterygopalatine portions.

First portion
The first or mandibular  or bony portion passes horizontally forward, between the neck of the mandible and the sphenomandibular ligament, where it lies parallel to and a little below the auriculotemporal nerve; it crosses the inferior alveolar nerve, and runs along the lower border of the lateral pterygoid muscle.

Branches include:
 Deep auricular artery
 Anterior tympanic artery
 Middle meningeal artery
 Inferior alveolar artery which gives off its mylohyoid branch just prior to entering the mandibular foramen
 Accessory meningeal artery

Second portion
The second or pterygoid or muscular portion runs obliquely forward and upward under cover of the ramus of the mandible and insertion of the temporalis, on the superficial (very frequently on the deep) surface of the lateral pterygoid muscle; it then passes between the two heads of origin of this muscle and enters the fossa.

Branches include:
 Masseteric artery
 Pterygoid branches
 Deep temporal arteries (anterior and posterior)
 Buccal artery

Third portion
The third or pterygopalatine or pterygomaxillary portion lies in the pterygopalatine fossa in relation with the pterygopalatine ganglion.  This is considered the terminal branch of the maxillary artery.

Branches include:
 Sphenopalatine artery (nasopalatine artery) is the terminal branch of the Maxillary artery
 Descending palatine artery (Greater palatine artery and lesser palatine artery)
 Infraorbital artery
 Posterior superior alveolar artery
 Artery of pterygoid canal
 Pharyngeal branch, directed to palatovaginal canal
 Middle superior alveolar artery (a branch of the infraorbital artery)
 Anterior superior alveolar arteries (a branch of the infraorbital artery)

Nomenclature
 Formerly, the term "external maxillary artery" was used to describe what is now known as the facial artery (per Terminologia anatomica.) Currently, the term "external maxillary artery" is less commonly used, and the terms "internal maxillary artery" and "maxillary artery" are equivalent.

Additional images

References

External links
 
  - "Infratemporal Fossa: Branches of the Maxillary Artery"
 Overview at tufts.edu

Arteries of the head and neck